Chukwuemeka Ujam (born March 6, 1974) is a Nigerian politician, and the elected member representing Nkanu East/West Federal Constituency of Enugu State. He is a member of the People's Democratic Party (PDP).

Early life and education
Chukwuemeka Ujam was born on 6 March 1974, to the family of Chief & Engr Mrs Nwafor Ujam. He began his secondary education at Federal Government College Enugu, and obtained his Senior School Certificate in 1991. Upon graduation, he proceeded to the University of Nigeria Nsukka for his university education, and obtained a Bachelor's (B.Eng Hons) degree in Electronics Engineering in 1997. He went on to King's College London, from where he obtained a Master's (M.Sc Hons) degree in Enterprise Information Systems in 2001. He then proceeded to the University of Kent, Canterbury, for his Doctorate (PhD) degree in Biometrics Security.

Career
Dr Ujam has a career background in telecommunications technology. He has held many senior engineering positions in several major UK telecoms and security organizations as well as board level responsibility in IT start up organizations. Positions he has held include Security Technical Architect at Metropolitan Police Service, Head, Technical Solution at Serco Trusted Borders (eBorders), Lead Technical Design Authority and Technical Architect at Atos Origin UK and Senior Technical Designer (Design, Security, Strategy and Data) at BT Global Services.

Political career
In 2011, Dr Chukwuemeka Ujam was appointed as Commissioner for Lands and Urban Development Enugu State under the leadership of the then Governor Sullivan Chime. During his tenure, he worked across the public and private sector lines to develop, craft and reform the administration of Land to serve the people and businesses in Enugu effectively. He also reduced the administrative complexities in the Ministry of Lands & Urban Development, Enugu by embracing and instituting the use of Information Technology in land administration.

In 2015, Dr. Ujam became the elected member representing Nkanu East/ West Federal Constituency of Enugu State in the 8th National Assembly. He was the deputy chairman House Committee on Telecommunication.

Personal life
Hon Dr. Chukwuemeka Ujam is married to Noyelum Ujam. They have two daughters and two sons.

Controversy
In March 2015, he was allegedly  accused of possessing 4000 Permanent Voter Cards (PVCs) at Ozalla, Nkanu East Lga Enugu State. The INEC later provided him with a certificate of return.

References

Living people
Alumni of King's College London
Alumni of the University of Kent
Members of the House of Representatives (Nigeria)
Peoples Democratic Party members of the House of Representatives (Nigeria)
Place of birth missing (living people)
University of Nigeria alumni
Federal Government College Enugu alumni
1974 births